Crazy is a 1994 album by Julio Iglesias.

Track listing

Charts

Weekly charts

Year-end charts

Certifications

References

1994 albums
Julio Iglesias albums
Spanish-language albums
Covers albums